Hla Myint is a Burmese politician, ambassador, and former mayor of Yangon. He was also a brigadier general in the Myanmar Army, and has served as a diplomat.

Myint studied at the Defense Services Academy from 1967 to 1971. He retired as brigadier general in 2002. After military service, he had served as ambassador to Argentina and Brazil from 2002 to 2005, and to Japan from 2005 to 2010.

References

Burmese diplomats
Burmese military personnel
Mayors of Yangon
Ambassadors of Myanmar to Argentina
Ambassadors of Myanmar to Brazil
Ambassadors of Myanmar to Japan
1940s births
Living people
Defence Services Academy alumni
Burmese generals